William Bradley was an English professional footballer who made over 130 appearances as a goalkeeper in the Football League for Newcastle United. Bradley was a member of Newcastle United's 1923–24 FA Cup-winning squad.

Personal life 
Bradley served as a gunner in the Royal Garrison Artillery and the Tank Corps during the First World War.

Career statistics

Honours 
Newcastle United

 FA Cup: 1923–24

References 

English footballers
English Football League players
Newcastle United F.C. players
Place of death missing
British Army personnel of World War I
1893 births
Year of death missing
Footballers from Gateshead
Association football goalkeepers
Royal Garrison Artillery soldiers
Royal Tank Regiment soldiers
Portsmouth F.C. players
Southern Football League players
Jarrow F.C. players
Ashington A.F.C. players
North Shields F.C. players
Leeds City F.C. wartime guest players
FA Cup Final players
English military personnel